Shuysky (masculine), Shuyskaya (feminine), or Shuyskoye (neuter) is the name of several rural localities in Russia:
Shuysky (rural locality), a settlement in Prudovsky Selsoviet of Novosilsky District of Oryol Oblast
Shuyskoye, Smolensk Oblast, a selo in Shuyskoye Rural Settlement of Vyazemsky District of Smolensk Oblast
Shuyskoye, Vologda Oblast, a selo in Sukhonsky Selsoviet of Mezhdurechensky District of Vologda Oblast
Shuyskaya, a station in Prionezhsky District of the Republic of Karelia